The Arun-class lifeboat was a fast all-weather lifeboat designed by the Royal National Lifeboat Institution (RNLI) for service at its stations around the coasts of the United Kingdom and Ireland. They were operated by the RNLI between 1971 and 2008. Many have been sold to see further service in the lifeboat and coastguard services of other countries.

The class takes its name from the River Arun in Sussex, England.

History

Two more boats were introduced in 1973 and 1974 and then full production started in 1975 although small numbers of Waveney-class boats were still built until 1982. By 1990, 46 Arun-class boats had been launched. The following year saw the launch of the first  - and  boats.

The three prototype boats were withdrawn between 1994 and 1997, the third of which then went on display at the National Lifeboat Museum. The production series boats were taken out of regular service between 1998 and 2007. While a few have found new uses around the coast of Great Britain, the majority have been sold to other lifeboat operators around the world, predominantly in China, Finland and Iceland  and some further boats were built new for service in Canada and Greece. Those travelling long distances go as deck cargo on larger ships but those going to closer harbours are generally sailed across under their own power. The first boat to go to Iceland, Richard Evans, was loaded as deck cargo on a container ship but was washed overboard during the passage – the only Arun to have been lost at sea.

Design
The design was developed for the RNLI by J.A. MacLachlan working for naval architects G.L. Watson of Glasgow. Initially proposed with chines along the hull to disperse the spray and improve stability when underway at speed, this caused a high deck above water which proved difficult when trying to get people aboard from the water, so the chines were dispensed with on the second boat and the deck curved down nearer the water. All differed in superstructure design, 52-01 having a raked back superstructure front with the flying bridge at the after end. 52-02 introduced forward raked wheelhouse windscreens, had a unique wheelhouse side window pattern and retained the aft mounted flying bridge. On 52-03, the flying bridge was moved to the forward end of the wheelhouse, the front of which was rounded. From 54-04, the forward flying bridge was standardised and the forward raked wheelhouse windscreens were reintroduced. The side windows were recessed from the superstructure sides. 54-04 had a Glass Reinforce Plastic hull and this was standardised for future boats. 54-04 to 54-07 retained the rounded transon but from 52-08 a square transom was reintroduced. The final external change came with 52-11 which had flush sided forward wheelhouse windows and this was a feature of all subsequent boats. In 1986 52-030 (ON 1100) became the only steel-hulled Arun. It was regarded as the best of the class for seakeeping, although the slowest. The GRP hulls were moulded in blue material in the outer skin. After a while it was found that water was accumulating in the fibreglass which added up to two tons to the weight. The boats had the coloured layer stripped off and replaced by a new one made with clear gel which reduced the amount of water absorbed.

The large watertight cabin gave it self-righting capability. Two survivor cabins are situated below decks where first aid and emergency equipment is stowed. The hull is divided into 26 watertight compartments as protection against sinking should it be holed. There is also a flying bridge above the main cabin with an auxiliary steering position which can be used when additional height or visibility is required during an operation. The boat won a Design Council award in 1982.

Two Caterpillar D343  diesel engines were fitted to boats up 52-14, subsequent boats being fitted with two Caterpillar 3408TA  .

RNLI fleet

Other fleets

Australia

Canada

Ten  boats were built for the Canadian Coast Guard. They were all built in Canada by Industrie Raymond Ltée of Sept-Iles, Quebec; East Isle Shipyard Ltd. of Georgetown, Prince Edward Island; Hike Metals & Shipbuilbing Ltd. of Wheatley, Ontario, with aluminium hulls except for the GRP-hulled British-built prototype (CCGS Bickerton) which was built by Halmatic, Southampton. They are considered "high endurance" lifeboats staffed by a crew of four. The first vessels of this class were ordered in 1990. The Canadian Coast Guard also maintains approximately three dozen smaller s.
They are considered "medium endurance" lifeboats.

Chile

China

Faroe Islands

Comment : Kept in same condition and used for SAR operations, covering all of the Faroe Islands.

Finland

Greece
The Greek boats were built in Greece by MotoMarine with GRP hulls. Ten are in service with the Hellenic Coast Guard.

Iceland

Madeira

References

Bibliography